Petroleuciscus esfahani is a species of cyprinid freshwater fish from Iran. It is size of about 10 cm.

The status of P. eshefani as an independent species has been questioned: rather it is probably a synonym of Alburnus doriae.

References

Petroleuciscus
Fish described in 2010
Fish of Iran